Snow in Paradise is a 2014 British thriller film directed by Andrew Hulme and co-written by Hulme and Martin Askew, who also co-stars in the film. It was screened in the Un Certain Regard section at the 2014 Cannes Film Festival. The film had its UK premier at the Curzon Soho as part of the London Film Festival.

Plot
Petty criminal Dave lives in London, high on crime and drugs. After a heist gone wrong brings about his best friend's death, he turns to Islam for finding peace to his feelings for shame and remorse, but soon his past life comes back to haunt him.

Cast
 Frederick Schmidt as Dave
 Martin Askew as Uncle Jimmy
 David Spinx as Micky
 Aymen Hamdouchi as Tariq
 Daniel Godward  as Old Gangster
 Claire-Louise Cordwell as Theresa
 Amira Ghazalla as Mrs. Anwar
 Ashley Chin as Amjad
 Joel Beckett as Kenny
 Clive Brunt as Lee
 John Dagleish as Tony
 Adam Nagaitis as Gravesy

References

External links
 Snow in Paradise Official Website 
 
 

2014 films
2014 thriller films
2014 directorial debut films
British thriller films
2010s English-language films
2010s British films